In coding theory, the dual code of a linear code

is the linear code defined by

where

is a scalar product.  In linear algebra terms, the dual code is the annihilator of C with respect to the bilinear form . The dimension of C and its dual always add up to the length n:

A generator matrix for the dual code is the parity-check matrix for the original code and vice versa.  The dual of the dual code is always the original code.

Self-dual codes
A self-dual code is one which is its own dual. This implies that n is even and dim C = n/2. If a self-dual code is such that each codeword's weight is a multiple of some constant , then it is of one of the following four types:
Type I codes are binary self-dual codes which are not doubly even. Type I codes are always even (every codeword has even Hamming weight).
Type II codes are binary self-dual codes which are doubly even.
Type III codes are ternary self-dual codes. Every codeword in a Type III code has Hamming weight divisible by 3.
Type IV codes are self-dual codes over F4. These are again even.

Codes of types I, II, III, or IV exist only if the length n is a multiple of 2, 8, 4, or 2 respectively.

References

External links 
 MATH32031: Coding Theory - Dual Code - pdf with some examples and explanations

Coding theory